Big Time Rush is an American musical sitcom television series created by Scott Fellows that originally aired on Nickelodeon from November 28, 2009, to July 25, 2013. It focuses on the Hollywood misadventures of four hockey players from Duluth, Minnesota, Kendall Knight, James Diamond, Carlos Garcia, and Logan Mitchell, after they are selected to form a boy band by fictional mega music producer Gustavo Rocque.

History
The series premiered with an hour-long pilot episode, "Big Time Audition", on Nickelodeon, on November 28, 2009. Its official debut episode premiered on January 18, 2010. The show's second season premiered on September 25, 2010. On May 24, 2011, Big Time Rush was renewed for a third season with production scheduled to begin January 2012. Season three premiered May 12, 2012. On March 10, 2012, a film adaptation named "Big Time Movie" based on the series premiered. On August 6, 2012, Nickelodeon renewed Big Time Rush for a 13-episode fourth season. Production began on January 7, 2013. The fourth season premiered May 2, 2013, and aired its series finale "Big Time Dreams" on July 25, 2013.

Cast and characters

Main 
 Kendall Schmidt as Kendall Knight, the leader of the group
 James Maslow as James Diamond, the handsome one of the group
 Carlos Pena Jr. as Carlos Garcia, the crazy, wild, and fun loving one of the group
 Logan Henderson as Logan Mitchell, the smart one of the group
 Ciara Bravo as Katie Knight, Kendall's younger sister
 Stephen Kramer Glickman as Gustavo Rocque, the boys' hot-tempered manager
 Tanya Chisholm (Seasons 2–4; recurring season 1) as Kelly Wainwright, Gustavo's assistant,

Recurring 
 Katelyn Tarver as Jo Taylor, an actress, a singer, and Kendall's girlfriend from North Carolina
 Challen Cates as Jennifer Knight, Kendall and Katie's mother, who takes care of all four boys while they are in L.A.
 Erin Sanders as Camille Roberts, a dramatic method actress, Jo and Lucy's best friend and Logan's girlfriend
 Malese Jow (Seasons 2–4) as Lucy Stone, a red-haired punk rocker and James's love interest, whom he ends up dating in the last episode
 Matt Riedy as Arthur Griffin, Gustavo's boss who is the CEO of RCM-CBT GlobalNet Sanyoid
 David Anthony Higgins as Reginald Bitters, the manager of the Palm Woods and Katie's nemesis.
 Denyse Tontz as Jennifer 1
 Spencer Locke (Season 1) and Kelli Goss (Seasons 2–4) as Jennifer 2
 Savannah Jayde as Jennifer 3
 Tucker Albrizzi as Tyler Duncan, a star of juice box, diaper and underwear commercials, and neighbor from Palm Woods
 Barnett O'Hara as Guitar Dude, a guitarist who was originally a cello player
 Daran Norris as Buddha Bob, the Palm Woods' maintenance worker.
 David Cade as Jett Stetson, Kendall's nemesis
 Tara Strong as Miss Collins, the teacher of the Palm Woods' one-room school campus
 Lorenzo Lamas as Dr. Hollywood, a local doctor
 Phil LaMarr as Hawk, Gustavo's nemesis and founder of rival business Hawk Records
 Fabio Lanzoni as himself, Katie's second nemesis and a pocket grill salesman. He has appeared in one episode for each season, except for the fourth.

Guest stars 

 Erik Estrada as Papi Garcia, Carlos' father
 Lisa Rinna as Brooke Diamond, James' mother
 Jill-Michele Meleán as Sylvia Garcia, Carlos' mother
 Lita Ford as herself
 Dee Bradley Baker as Mr. Smitty
 JC Gonzalez as himself
 Matthew Moy as Deke the blogger
 Rob Paulsen as Sam Sellmart
 Curt Hansen as Dak Zevon
 Elizabeth Gillies as Heather Fox
 Russell Brand as himself
 Tom Kenny as Patchy the Pirate
 Cher Lloyd as herself
 Rajiv Satyal as the scientist
 Jordin Sparks as herself
 Miranda Cosgrove as herself
 Snoop Dogg as himself
 Chris Paul as himself
 Chris Masters as himself
 Victoria Justice as herself
 Alexa Vega as herself
 JoJo Wright as himself
 Fabio Lanzoni as himself
 Austin Mahone as himself
 Lucas Cruikshank as himself
 Nicole Scherzinger as herself
 Annet Mahendru as Princess Svetlana

Episodes

Film adaptation 

In late 2011, Nickelodeon announced that a television film based on the television series was going to premiere. However, a promo did not air until February 2012. The movie premiered on Nickelodeon on March 10, 2012, at 8 p.m. ET/PT. Throughout the whole weekend, the movie drew 13.1 million viewers.

Production 
The series was conceived and created by Scott Fellows, formerly the creator, executive producer and showrunner of Ned's Declassified School Survival Guide. Fellows says his inspiration for the show was the musical comedy show, The Monkees—a popular and culturally significant American television series from the 1960s about a group of four young male adults who form a rock band, and perform songs while having comedic adventures. Although the show had a concept as early as 2007, the series had no actual title as late as August 2009.

Music 

Big Time Rush is a Nickelodeon Viacom Music Productions Band consisting of four members: Kendall Schmidt, James Maslow, Logan Henderson, and Carlos Pena Jr. Nickelodeon partnered with Columbia/Epic Label Group to produce the show, which is why music and instrumentals are incorporated throughout the series.

Big Time Rush's debut album, B.T.R., was released on October 11, 2010, via Sony/Columbia. Their second full-length album, entitled Elevate, was released on November 21, 2011. Big Time Rush released their new song "If I Ruled the World" ft. Iyaz on iTunes July 22. They have also released a number of new songs such as "Music Sounds Better With U" (feat. Mann), "Love Me Love Me", "You're Not Alone", and "Superstar". They also released three singles, "Paralyzed", "Blow Your Speakers", and "Epic" in 2012. Then, "Epic" was the bonus track on the U.K. album version. They released their third CD, 24/Seven in the summer of 2013. Among the songs on the CD is "We Are" which won a Viewer's Choice award.

Nickelodeon partnered with Columbia/Epic Label Group to produce the show, which incorporates original music into the series. Big Time Rush is one of the three Nickelodeon shows (the others are iCarly and Victorious) on which the cable network is partnering with the music group to promote music as well as shows. The Los Angeles Times has been critical of the show's focus on music, noting:

The closing credits of Nickelodeon airings of the show contain short clips of music videos for singles featured the series. Occasionally, full versions of the videos are featured.

The show incorporates wacky sound effects, some laugh-like noises, music, and editing cuts designed to make it more humorous to the intended demographic of viewers age 10 to 18; this was also typical of creator Scott Fellows' previous work on Nickelodeon. However, the show does not have a laugh track. Big Time Rush made an appearance at the 2010 Kids' Choice Awards, the 2010 Teen Choice Award and performed at the 2011 Kids' Choice Awards. they also appeared in an episode of BrainSurge during the week of April 18–22, 2011. On November 24, 2011, the group performed the National Anthem at Cowboys Stadium for the Thanksgiving NFL game which was broadcast on CBS. Big Time Rush has released 3 albums, B.T.R, Elevate, and 24/Seven.

More singles were released in 2012. Big Time Rush covered The Beatles songs in their movie "Big Time Movie" which was released March 10, 2012.

They went on tour with Victoria Justice in 2013 on the Summer Break Tour. Their final tour was the Big Time Rush: Live World Tour in 2014 for the month of February.

In 2021, the band officially announced their comeback via Twitter, after their indefinite hiatus back in 2014, who will be performing two shows in December 2021.

Casting 
A nationwide casting effort began in 2007. More than 1,500 teens and young adults auditioned for the four roles. James Maslow and Logan Henderson were the easiest and first actors cast. Kendall Schmidt was the last actor cast, and the most difficult role to cast. The role of Kendall Knight was originally to go to Curt Hansen, who later played Dak Zevon on the show, but when he appeared a lot older than the others and sounded too much like James in the pick up pilot, the producers auditioned and cast Schmidt after a recommendation by Logan Henderson, who was also friends with the actor before casting. Filming of the series began in August 2009. Actor Carlos Pena Jr. previously worked with Scott Fellows on Ned's Declassified School Survival Guide. As he had just entered the Boston Conservatory to study musical theatre, Pena was reluctant to audition but sent in a tape at the encouragement of his manager. Executive producer Scott Fellows was inspired to write each character by the personality of the actor playing him.

In addition to Pena, five are alumni of Scott Fellows make appearances in this show: Spencer Locke, Carlie Casey, Daran Norris, Adam Conway (as recurring cast members), and James Arnold Taylor (as a guest star).

Locations 
The series was filmed in Studio 27, Paramount Pictures in Hollywood, Los Angeles, California. The series premiere's one-hour special took place in the suburbs of Los Angeles and a small town in Minnesota.

Reception

Audience reception 
A one-hour special preview (which serves as the series pilot and first episode) debuted on Nickelodeon on November 28, 2009, drawing an audience of 3.6 million viewers. The series' official premiere on January 18, 2010 (which followed the premiere of the iCarly special "iSaved Your Life"), was watched by a total of 6.8 million total viewers, Nickelodeon's highest-rated live-action series debut.

Critical reception 
The show received positive reviews from audiences and mixed reviews from critics.
The Pittsburgh Post-Gazette stated the show was "Nick's attempt at building a Jonas Brothers-style pop band. It's Nick's answer to Disney Channel's 'JONAS,' albeit slightly less organic since 'Rush' doesn't feature siblings." The Hartford Courant stated the series a "not so good" show "with their thin pop and unfunny comedies". The Boston Globe stated the show as "one example in a growing list of kid shows selling showbiz fantasies to children. The genre is stronger than ever now and more fixated on the perks of the glamorous Hollywood lifestyle ... wish fulfillment at a time when tabloid dreams are ubiquitous." DVD Talk had the following review of the Big Time Rush: Season 1, Volume 1 DVD. "It would be hard to craft a description engineered to be less interesting to me, and yet, as I plowed through this collection from the series' beginnings, I frequently found myself amended and entertained. Say what you will about Nickelodeon's teen programming, but they've got the art of making a solid sitcom down to a science."

Awards and nominations

Home media

Broadcast
The series aired worldwide on Nickelodeon.

Season 1
It was shown as a preview in Australia and New Zealand on April 10, 2010, and premiered on May 15, 2010. It previewed on April 16, 2010, and premiered on May 31, 2010, in Southeast Asia. In the United Kingdom and Ireland it previewed on May 27, 2010, and premiered on June 21, 2010. In Canada it previewed on August 6, 2010, and premiered on September 6, 2010.

Season 2
It premiered in January 2011 in Australia and New Zealand and in February 2011 in the UK and Ireland. It was announced by Nickelodeon in October 2011 that Big Time Rush would go free-to-air on CITV in the UK.

Season 3
The third season premiered November 2012 in Australia and New Zealand and in December 2012 in the UK and Ireland.

Season 4
It premiered in August 2013 in Canada and in late 2013 in the UK and Ireland.

Notes

References

External links 

 Big Time Rush at Nickelodeon
 
 Big Time Rush MySpace Page
 Big Time Rush on HDgreetings.com
 Big Time Rush for 3rd Seasons

 
2000s American music television series
2010s American music television series
2000s American teen sitcoms
2010s American teen sitcoms
2000s Nickelodeon original programming
2010s Nickelodeon original programming
2009 American television series debuts
2013 American television series endings
English-language television shows
Sony Music
Television series about brothers
Television series about families
Television series about fictional musicians
Television series created by Scott Fellows
Television shows set in Los Angeles
Television shows set in Minnesota
Television shows filmed in Minnesota
Films about boy bands